Hossein Sabouri (born 3 July 1978) is an Iranian professional futsal coach and former player. He is currently head coach of Sunich in the Iranian Futsal Super League.

Honours

Player

 Iranian Futsal Super League
 Runners-up (2): 2004–05 (Eram Kish), 2008–09 (Eram Kish)

References 

1978 births
Living people
People from Qom
Iranian men's futsal players
Almas Shahr Qom FSC players
Iranian futsal coaches